The Army Regulation (AR) 25-50 Preparing and Managing Correspondence is the United States Army's administrative regulation that  "establishes three forms of correspondence authorized for use within the Army: a letter, a memorandum, and a message."

Style Manuals
APD uses the following references and style manuals: 
 Government Printing Office Style Manual - 2016 Edition
 Chicago Manual of Style - 16th Edition

Microsoft Word Templates
APD prepared templates for use in Microsoft Word 97 for members of the Department of the Army.

There are a number of other templates and documents purporting to be templates on the Army's milSuite collaboration site. This page provides a scaffolding for other users to publish Microsoft Word templates.

See also
Army Regulation 381-12 (U)
United States Army Publishing Directorate

References

External links 
 APD's Website
 ADP's Contact Us web page

 
 
United States Army organization